The red tree rat (Pithecheir melanurus) is a species of rodent in the family Muridae.
It is found only in western Java, Indonesia.

References

Pithecheir
Mammals described in 1840
Taxa named by René Lesson
Taxonomy articles created by Polbot